Old Robbers (lit. "elderly bandits") is a 1972 Soviet comedy-drama by Eldar Ryazanov, filmed on Mosfilm. The movie title resembles the name of a Russian children's traditional yard game Cossacks-Robbers.

Plot 
Old detective Nikolay Myachikov is being retired by his boss Fedyaev. The official version is that Myachikov has solved no crimes for the last two months, but the real reason is that Fedyaev's boss wants Myachikov's position to go to another man, Proskudin. Fedyaev gives Myachikov a month to show he should not lose his job. Myachikov's best friend, engineer Valentin Vorobyov, is also due to retire but wants to stay on. He suggests to Myachikov that they set up the biggest crime ever and then solve it together so they will be allowed to continue working. Their first idea is to steal a Rembrandt painting from a museum. The plan fails when no one notices that the canvas is missing, believing the note the thieves left saying it has been removed for restoration. Without great difficulty, Myachikov and Vorobyov sneak the picture back. Their next plan is to enlist the help of Myachikov's neighbour, Anna Pavlovna, a bank employee. Their plan to stage a robbery and pretend to recover the loot goes away when an actual robber intervenes. The trio struggle to understand what has happened, how to make restitution, and return to their honest lives.

Cast 
 Yuri Nikulin — Nikolay Sergeevitch Myachikov
Yevgeny Yevstigneyev — Valentin Petrovich Vorobyov
 Olga Aroseva — Anna Pavlovna Suzdaleva
 Georgi Burkov — Fyodor Fyodorovitch Fedyaev
 Andrei Mironov — Yury Yevgenyevitch Proskudin
 Valentina Vladimirova — Masha, Vorobyov's wife
 Yuri Belov — Petya, militsiaman
 Valentina Talyzina — Fedyaev's secretary
 Roman Filippov — robber
 Nina Agapova — museum keeper
 Irina Murzaeva — old museum keeper
 Lev Durov — driver of the collector car 
 Boris Runge — shoes shop director
 Gotlib Roninson — doctor
 Yuri Smirnov — locksmith
 Georgi Kulikov — Vorobyov's colleague
 Viktor Bajkov — Vorobyov's colleague
 Yevgeni Perov — Vorobyov's colleague
 Natalya Sajko — Vorobyov's colleague
  — Vorobyov's colleague
 Aleksandr Shirvindt — spokesman of the minister
 Eldar Ryazanov — Myachikov's colleague
 Yuri Yakovlev — narrator (voice)

External links 

1972 films
1972 comedy-drama films
1970s crime comedy films
1970s heist films
Mosfilm films
1970s Russian-language films
Films set in museums
Films shot in Lviv
Films shot in Moscow
Films directed by Eldar Ryazanov
Films scored by Andrey Petrov
Soviet comedy-drama films
Russian comedy-drama films